"Love Hangover" is a song by the Motown singer Diana Ross, recorded in 1975 and released as a single on March 16, 1976. It rose to number one on the Billboard Hot 100 and Hot-Selling Soul Singles. It also hit number one on the Record World disco charts. * The original single peaked just 3 months before the first publication of Billboard's Dance Club Songs chart, yet, in an ironic twist of fate, a remixed version by Eric Kupper, known as "Love Hangover 2020", was the last song to hit number one on Billboard Dance Club Songs chart in March 2020 before the chart was suspended.

Producer Hal Davis instructed the song's engineer Russ Terrana to install a strobe light so that Ross could be in the "disco" mindset. As the song changed from ballad to uptempo, Ross became more comfortable with the material; she hummed, sang bit parts, laughed, danced around and even imitated Billie Holiday. The carefree and sensual nature of Ross' vocals and the music's direction helped to sell the song, in addition to the background vocals relying heavily on Donna Summer's 1975 hit "Love to Love You Baby".

The song was first released on the album Diana Ross in February 1976. Motown initially promoted the album by releasing the single "I Thought it Took a Little Time". Singing group the 5th Dimension released "Love Hangover" as a single. Motown then issued Ross' version as a 7" single. Both versions entered the chart the same day. By the time Ross' version of the song reached number one, Ross had reinvented herself as a disco diva and the 5th Dimension's version had peaked at number 80. It won Ross a Grammy nomination for Best Female R&B Vocal Performance.

"Love Hangover" reached number one on May 29, 1976. That week, Casey Kasem reported on American Top 40 that with that song Diana had broken the record for the most number-one hits by a female vocalist. With her fourth number-one, she surpassed Connie Francis, Helen Reddy, Roberta Flack, and Cher, all of whom were tied with three each. During the 1980s, Ross went on to score two more number-one hits, making six, establishing her record for 12 years. Whitney Houston would break this record in 1988, Madonna in 1990, and Taylor Swift in 2018.

In popular culture

 The song was featured in the 1977 Diane Keaton film Looking for Mr. Goodbar during a bar scene.
 Diana Ross sang the song on the episode of The Muppet Show in which she appeared as the guest star.
 Octavia St. Laurent walked to this song during one of the runway scenes in the 1990 documentary Paris is Burning and the song is featured on the film's soundtrack. 
 The song was featured in BBC2's 1995 punk documentary Arena: Punk and the Pistols.  Back in 1976, the song had been a favourite of early UK punks such as the Bromley Contingent and Jordan who would dance to the song at Soho-based lesbian nightclub Louise's, where it was the house anthem.
 The song was featured in the "Was It Good for You" episode of the TV series Sex and the City season 2 in 1999.
 The song was featured in CBC's annual year-end playoff montage on Hockey Night in Canada in 2008.
 The song is featured in promos for the final 2014–2015 season of Mad Men.
The song was featured in the final episode of the first season of FX's drama series Pose in 2018, during the House vs House challenge between House of Evangelista and House of Ferocity.

Remixes

Motown released versions of Ross's version in 1988 (remixed by the British team PWL) and 1993 (remixed by Frankie Knuckles for the album Diana Extended: The Remixes and by Joey Negro for a single).

Almighty Records released a remixed version in 2007 (remixed by the UK team Almighty).

New remixes were released in 2020 by Eric Kupper, peaking at number one on March 28 on the Billboard Dance Club chart.

Track listing
1993 UK 12" Promo
Side A
"Love Hangover" (Tribal Hangover) – 9:26
"Love Hangover" (Classic Club – EP version) – 8:20
"Love Hangover" (Tribal Reprise) – 5:25
"Your Love" – 3:58
Side B
"Upside Down" ('93 Remix – EP version) – 8:00
"Upside Down" (Dub 2 – Morales) – 7:37
"Someday We'll Be Together" ('93 Remix – EP version) – 8:40
"Someday We'll Be Together" (Final Sound Factory) – 6:54

Cover versions

 The before mentioned simultaneously in 1976 issued 5th Dimension cover would be that group's last Hot 100 hit. 
 Players Association covered the track in 1977.
 Stanley Turrentine on The Man with the Sad Face in 1976.
 In 1982 British new wave band The Associates released a double side 45 single "18 Carat Love Affair" / "Love Hangover" which peaked at No. 21 on the UK chart in 1982.
 Background vocals from the original alternate take were sampled by Hardrive in the 1993 House song "No Cure".
 British soul singer Pauline Henry (former lead vocalist of the Chimes) recorded a contemporary version of the track in 1995 (released as a single).
Italian dance act Black Box sampled the song on their 1996 disco-house single, "I Got The Vibration/Positive Vibration", which reached no. 21 in the UK and no. 18 in the Italian charts.
 The song was sampled in Monica's 1998 hit "The First Night", which hit No. 1 on the Billboard Hot 100.
 Mariah Carey performed the song also on the concert tribute to Diana Ross (2000). Carey also performed a mix of "Love Hangover" the lead single from her 1999 seventh studio album, Rainbow, "Heartbreaker" on her Angels Advocate Tour between 2009 and 2010, on All The Hits Tour, a co-headlining tour with American singer Lionel Richie in 2017, and second Las Vegas residency, The Butterfly Returns in 2018.
 Singer Jody Watley recorded a downtempo version for her 2006 album, The Makeover.
 Erykah Badu performed the song in 2007 as part of the BET Tribute To Diana Ross as she was awarded the BET Lifetime Achievement Award.
 Australian singer-songwriter Tina Arena recorded a version in 2007 for her album, Songs of Love & Loss.
 In 2007, Stephanie Edwards sang it on the sixth season of American Idol.
 The song would become part of the hip-hop lexicon via sampling by Will Smith, Heavy D, Master P, Monica, Janet Jackson, Bone Thugs-N-Harmony, French artist MC Solaar, and Emily King, who made use of it for her 2007 debut album East Side Story in the song "Walk in My Shoes".
 Guns N' Roses lead singer Axl Rose sang the chorus of "Love Hangover" during an instrumental interlude in the song "If the World" on the Asian leg of the Chinese Democracy World Tour 2009/2010.

Charts

Weekly charts

Year-end charts

All-time charts

See also 
 List of Hot 100 number-one singles of 1976 (U.S.)
 List of number-one R&B singles of 1976 (U.S.)
 List of number-one dance singles of 1976 (U.S.)
 List of number-one dance singles of 2020 (U.S.)

References

External links
 List of cover versions of "Love Hangover" at SecondHandSongs.com
 

1976 singles
1976 songs
The Associates (band) songs
Billboard Hot 100 number-one singles
Cashbox number-one singles
Diana Ross songs
The 5th Dimension songs
Pauline Henry songs
Songs written by Pam Sawyer
Motown singles
Song recordings produced by Hal Davis
1975 songs
Songs written by Marilyn McLeod